What the Game's Been Missing! is the second studio album by American rapper Juelz Santana. The album was released on November 22, 2005 under Diplomat Records and Def Jam Recordings. The album yielded the singles "Mic Check", "There It Go (The Whistle Song)", "Make It Work For Ya" (feat. Lil Wayne and Young Jeezy) and "Clockwork".

Background
In an interview with Hip Hop Canada, Juelz Santana remarked that his approach to the making of What the Game's Been Missing was different from his other albums, noting the amount of effort and work he was able to contribute to it, saying: "I'm definitely going to say that I like this album the best mainly because I got to work on it and I got to grow with it. I took care of a lot of things on it and not to say that my other albums were not good, but I just got to put more work into the making of this one."

Originally 160 songs were recorded for the album, taking over a year to make. He described the process as "learning how to ride a bike." asserting to the fact that the basis of the album developed deeper into production. The album was also influenced by the 1994 film Fresh, In the song "Lil' Boy Fresh" he loosely summarizes the story from beginning to end.

Commercial performance
In the United States, What the Game's Been Missing! debuted at number nine on the Billboard 200, selling 141,000 copies in its first week. As of January 3, 2006, the album has been certified Gold by the Recording Industry Association of America (RIAA), for selling 500,000 copies. As of October 2015 the album has sold 1,250,000 copies and gained platinum status.

Track listing
Credits adapted from the album's liner notes.

Sample credits
 "Rumble Young Man Rumble" contains a sample of "Never Had a Woman on My Mind (More Than a Day)", written by Mike Rapp, as performed by A-440 featuring Ted Neeley.
 "Oh Yes" contains a sample of "Please Mr. Postman", written by William Garrett, Georgia Dobbins, Robert Bateman, Brian Holland, and Freddie Gorman, as performed by The Marvelettes.
 "Shottas" contains a sample from "Your Love", written by Miguel Collins and LeRoy Moore, as performed by Sizzla.
 "Lil' Boy Fresh" contains a sample of "I've Got To Be", written by Kathy Wakefield and Leonard Caston Jr., as performed by Eddie Kendricks.
 "Murda Murda" contains a sample of "World-A-Music", written and performed by Ini Kamoze.
 "Kid is Back" contains interpolations of "My Boyfriend's Back", written by Bob Feldman, Gerald Goldstein, and Richard Gottehrer.
 "Daddy" contains a sample of "I Don't Want to Miss a Thing", written by Diane Warren, as performed by Aerosmith.

Charts

Weekly charts

Year-end charts

Certifications

References

2005 albums
Juelz Santana albums
Def Jam Recordings albums
Albums produced by the Runners
Albums produced by J.U.S.T.I.C.E. League
Diplomat Records albums
Albums produced by Neo da Matrix